P Government of Karnataka. He was also the leader of opposition during 1970-1971 in Legislative Assembly. Siddhaveerappa was instrumental in bringing irrigation to Davangere. A neighbourhood by name Siddhaveerappa Layout has been named after him in Davangere in his memory.

References

State cabinet ministers of Karnataka
Year of birth missing (living people)
Living people
Leaders of the Opposition in the Karnataka Legislative Assembly